The grey-breasted flycatcher (Lathrotriccus griseipectus) is a species of bird in the family Tyrannidae. It is found in western Ecuador and northwestern Peru. Its natural habitats are subtropical or tropical dry forests, subtropical or tropical moist lowland forests, and subtropical or tropical moist montane forests. It is threatened by habitat loss.

References

External links
BirdLife Species Factsheet.

grey-breasted flycatcher
Birds of Ecuador
Birds of Peru
Birds of the Tumbes-Chocó-Magdalena
grey-breasted flycatcher
Taxonomy articles created by Polbot